Roland Wohlfarth (born 11 January 1963) is a former professional footballer who played as a forward.

Club career
Wohlfarth was born in Bocholt. He was active in the Bundesliga from 1981 until 1998, spanning 287 games and 120 goals. At first Wohlfarth played for Borussia Bocholt in his youth, then for Duisburg, Bayern Munich, Leipzig and Bochum. His career ended in the year 2000 at Wuppertal. With Bayern Munich he won the Bundesliga in 1985, 1986, 1987, 1989 and 1990, the DFB Cup in 1986 and the DFL-Supercup in 1987 and 1990.

In the final of the DFB-Pokal on 3 May 1986, Wohlfarth scored a hat-trick in a 5–2 victory against VfB Stuttgart.

At Bayern Munich he had to fight for his place in the first-team squad every season, against top class newcomers of the club. He usually found success in doing this, becoming top scorer of the Bundesliga on two occasions, in 1989 with 17 goals and 1991 with 21.

International career
Despite his club success with Bayern Munich, Wohlfarth only earned two caps for West Germany in 1986 and 1989 respectively. He failed to score in either appearance.

Controversy
In the first doping judgement of the Bundesliga from 16 February 1995, Wohlfarth was convicted of the intake of forbidden substances (anorectics), and received a two-month ban.

Career statistics

International

Honours
Bayern Munich
Bundesliga: 1984–85, 1985–86, 1986–87, 1988–89, 1989–90
DFB-Pokal: 1985–86
DFB/DFL-Supercup: 1987, 1990

Individual
2. Bundesliga top scorer 1983–84
Bundesliga top scorer: 1988–89, 1990–91

References

External links
 
 
 

1963 births
Living people
People from Bocholt, Germany
Sportspeople from Münster (region)
German footballers
Germany international footballers
Association football forwards
Germany under-21 international footballers
Germany youth international footballers
MSV Duisburg players
FC Bayern Munich footballers
AS Saint-Étienne players
VfL Bochum players
1. FC Lokomotive Leipzig players
Wuppertaler SV players
1. FC Bocholt players
Bundesliga players
2. Bundesliga players
Ligue 1 players
German expatriate footballers
German expatriate sportspeople in France
Expatriate footballers in France
Footballers from North Rhine-Westphalia
West German footballers